A Killing on the Exchange is a six-part British television crime drama series, first broadcast on 6 March 1987, that aired on ITV. The series centres on Detective Superintendent Lance Thorne (John Duttine), who investigates the murder of a top financier, whose death uncovers a web of double dealing in the high-flying world of banking, where jealousy and lust are rife amongst the suspects. The series was written by Paul Ableman and produced by Anglia Television.

The series also starred Tim Woodward, Siân Phillips, Kenneth Farrington, Jaye Griffiths, Kim Thomson and Joss Ackland in supporting roles. A tie-in novel, also written by Paul Ableman, was published on 19 February 1987. Notably, the series has never been released on DVD.

Cast
 John Duttine as Det. Supt. Lance Thorne 
 Gavan O'Herlihy as Dan Maitland 
 Tim Woodward as John Field 
 Lesa Lockford as Millicent Thorne 
 Siân Phillips as Isobel Makepeace 
 Charlie Dore as Grace Field 
 Kenneth Farrington as Mr. Morrison 
 Jaye Griffiths as Diana 
 Kim Thomson as Kate MacRenny 
 Joss Ackland as Sir Max Sillman 
 Adam Blackwood as Sgt. Ballantyne 
 Yvonne Bonnamy as Nina Novotny 
 Laura Venn as Evey Field

Episodes

References

External links

1987 British television series debuts
1987 British television series endings
1980s British drama television series
1980s British television miniseries
Television series by ITV Studios
Television shows produced by Anglia Television
English-language television shows